Prevel or Prével is a French surname. Notable people with the surname include:

Jacques Prevel (1915–1951), French poet
Louis Prével (1879–1964), French rower

French-language surnames